The Taishū (taishū uma) or Tsushima (tsushima uma) is a rare Japanese breed of small horse from Tsushima Island in the Korea Strait, in Nagasaki Prefecture, Japan.

In 1989 the population was reported as "critical" at 89 head. In 2007 it was listed by the FAO as "critical-maintained", and a population of 30 was reported in 2008.

The Taishū is small, with strong legs. In the past, it was used for transport on the narrow paths between remote villages in the mountains of the island.

References

Horse breeds
Horse breeds originating in Japan